Australia won a total of four medals at the 2009 World Championships in Athletics held in Berlin.

Medalists
The following Australian competitors won medals at the Championships:

Team selection

Track and road events

Field and combined events

References

External links
Official competition website

Nations at the 2009 World Championships in Athletics
World Championships in Athletics
2009